Ratanapol Sor Vorapin (born Preecha Charoenthara, formerly Anucha Phothong (อนุชา โพธิ์ทอง)) is a Thai former professional boxer. He is the older brother of former World Boxing Organization Bantamweight champion Ratanachai Sor Vorapin.

Early life
Vorapin was born on June 6, 1974, to Somjai and Somjit Phothong in Dan Khun Thot, Nakhon Ratchasima province. Despite having large amounts of land, Vorapin, his parents, and his 14 siblings were impoverished farmers, as the mountainous ground was poor soil for agriculture. Because of his poverty, he became a boxer at age fourteen in Muaythai using the names "Tonaonoy Toichainee" (ทนเอาหน่อย ต่อยใช้หนี้) and "Lion Luknamjai" (ไลอ้อน ลูกน้ำใจ) sponsored by Yindee Juntacup, a local celebrity.

Professional career
Vorapin traveled to Bangkok to fight Muaythai under Sor Vorapin Boxing Gym. The name "Ratanapol" is actually the name of another fighter. Going pro in 1990, Ratanapol fought in the place of Chana Porpaoin, out because of his injured nose, and defeated his opponent. Because of that victory, he received serious support.

When Fahlan Lukmingkwan lost the IBF Mini flyweight championship to Filipino Manny Melchor in mid-1992, Ratanapol was encouraged by Sr. Col. Banju Ongsangkune and Suchart "Pe Poster" Kerdmek to return to Thailand. On December 10, 1992, at Nimibutr Stadium, he scored a 12-round split decision victory over Manny Melchor to win the Mini flyweight title. He would defend that title against twelve boxers, but he lost the title on the scales on  March 15, 1996, because he could not make his weight 105 pounds to qualify. On May 18 the same year, however, he returned as the world champion and he retained it six times until December 27, 1997, when he received a 5th-round TKO loss to South African Zolani Petelo at Songkhla province, southern Thailand.

He had two unsuccessful attempts at the IBF Junior flyweight title, first dropping a unanimous decision to Will Grigsby on December 18, 1998. And then on December 2, 2000, he received a 3rd-round TKO loss to Mexican Ricardo "El Finito" López in Las Vegas. Near the end of the career, he changed his manager to Kokiet "Sia Ko" Panichyarom of Kokiet Group and promoted to Flyweight and won the PABA title.

Boxing style
Ratanapol had a heavy left punch and a long reach but little footwork or agility. His right hand was used mainly to judge distance for his left, similar to the famed Khaosai Galaxy, even receiving the nickname "Little Khaosai" from Thai boxing fans.

In addition every time before the bout, he shouted "Chaiyo...Chaiyo...Ya Mo Ok Suek!!" (ไชโย...ไชโย...ย่าโมออกศึก!!; lit: "Cheer...Cheer...Grandma Mo to Battle!!") to create a frenzy.

Retirement
After retirement, Ratanapol's life was very difficult. Burdened by debt, he sold street vendor noodles in Bang Lamphu neighborhood near Sor Vorapin Boxing Gym with his wife, and sold DVDs of his own biography on the Bangkok streets. At the most stressful moments, he attempted suicide by hanging with an electric wire He also received ordination at Wat Phra Dhammakaya.

Politics
In politically Ratnapol alliance with the United Front for Democracy Against Dictatorship (UDD) or Red Shirts, and joined the protesters on several occasions such as 2005–06 Thai political crisis, or 2013–14 Thai political crisis etc.

Professional boxing record

Titles in boxing
Major World Titles:
IBF Mini Flyweight Champion (December 1992) (May 1996) (2x) (105 lbs)
Regional & International Titles:
IBF International Mini Flyweight Champion (June 1992) (105 lbs)
PABA Flyweight Champion (November 2007) (May 2009) (2x) (112 lbs)

References

External links
 

1974 births
Living people
Mini-flyweight boxers
Light-flyweight boxers
Flyweight boxers
World mini-flyweight boxing champions
International Boxing Federation champions
Ratanapol Sor Vorapin
Ratanapol Sor Vorapin
Southpaw boxers